Pedro da Silva Moutinho (born 9 September 1979) is a Portuguese retired footballer who played as a centre forward.

He spent most of his career in Scotland with Falkirk (three spells, 161 overall appearances and 23 goals). Professionally, other than in his own country, he also competed in Cyprus and Romania.

Club career
Born in Santo Tirso, Porto District, Moutinho moved to C.S. Marítimo from amateurs U.D. Rio Maior, but spent the better part of his early years with the former's reserves. He also served two loans whilst under contract, including a two-year spell at F.C. Penafiel of the Segunda Liga.

In the summer of 2004, Moutinho signed with Falkirk in Scotland, initially on a one-year deal. He scored 19 goals overall in his first four seasons at the club, including a memorable goal against Rangers for the equaliser in a 2–2 draw in 2005, but a knee injury kept him out of the second half of his team's Scottish First Division championship-winning side in 2004–05.

Moutinho was close to sealing a transfer to Kayserispor, but the deal was not concluded before the closure of the Turkish transfer window in early 2008. On 21 May, he eventually left Falkirk and signed a return to his country as he re-joined Marítimo. He remarked "I am going to keep the house I have in Falkirk and hopefully I’ll be back. I feel now is the right move for me with a two-year contract but after that I will be a free agent again and who knows"– signalling his intent to return to the Bairns in the future.

Rarely used during his second stint in Madeira, Moutinho finished the campaign on loan to fellow Primeira Liga side Rio Ave FC. He also did not manage to find the net here.

In October 2009, Moutinho was released by Marítimo and rejoined Falkirk. On 8 November, he started and scored during their 3–3 home draw with Celtic and, in January of the following year, his contract was extended until the end of 2009–10.

Moutinho left the Falkirk Stadium on 13 May 2010, signing with AEP Paphos FC from Cyprus. In the final days of the following transfer window, however, following a trial at fellow Scottish Premier League club Motherwell, he re-signed with Falkirk for a third time, being released at the end of the season.

In early August 2011, the 32-year-old Moutinho changed teams and countries again, joining FC Brașov in Romania. Subsequently, he signed a one-year deal with CD Atlético Baleares of the Spanish Segunda División B.

On 31 March 2015, after nearly two years out of football, Moutinho moved to Scottish League One team Stenhousemuir until June. At the end of the campaign, he was released.

After one season in the Portuguese lower leagues, being relegated with C.F. Caniçal, Moutinho retired at 37 and became a football consultant in Madeira.

References

External links

1979 births
Living people
People from Santo Tirso
Portuguese footballers
Association football forwards
Primeira Liga players
Liga Portugal 2 players
Segunda Divisão players
F.C. Tirsense players
C.S. Marítimo players
F.C. Famalicão players
F.C. Penafiel players
Rio Ave F.C. players
Scottish Premier League players
Scottish Football League players
Scottish Professional Football League players
Falkirk F.C. players
Stenhousemuir F.C. players
Cypriot First Division players
AEP Paphos FC players
Liga I players
FC Brașov (1936) players
Segunda División B players
CD Atlético Baleares footballers
Portugal youth international footballers
Portugal under-21 international footballers
Portuguese expatriate footballers
Expatriate footballers in Scotland
Expatriate footballers in Cyprus
Expatriate footballers in Romania
Expatriate footballers in Spain
Portuguese expatriate sportspeople in Scotland
Portuguese expatriate sportspeople in Cyprus
Portuguese expatriate sportspeople in Romania
Portuguese expatriate sportspeople in Spain
Sportspeople from Porto District